Timonius jambosella is a species of plant in the family Rubiaceae. It is endemic to Sri Lanka.

Culture
The species is known as "අංගන - angina" in Sinhala.

References

Guettardeae
Flora of Sri Lanka
Critically endangered plants
Taxonomy articles created by Polbot